AM-1248 is a drug that acts as a moderately potent agonist for both the cannabinoid receptors CB1 and CB2, but with some dispute between sources over its exact potency and selectivity. Replacing the 3-(1-naphthoyl) group found in many indole derived cannabinoid ligands, with an adamantoyl group, generally confers significant CB2 selectivity, but reasonable CB1 affinity and selectivity is retained when an N-methylpiperidin-2-ylmethyl substitution is used at the indole 1-position. The related compound 1-pentyl-3-(1-adamantoyl)indole was identified as having been sold as a cannabinoid designer drug in Hungary in 2011, along with another synthetic cannabinoid AM-679.

Legality
Sweden's public health agency suggested to classify AM-1248 as hazardous substance on June 1, 2015.

As of October 2015 AM-1248 is a controlled substance in China.

See also 
 A-834,735
 AB-001
 AM-411
 AM-1220
 AM-2233
 Cannabipiperidiethanone

References 

AM cannabinoids
Aminoalkylindoles
Piperidines
Adamantanoylindoles
Designer drugs